The National Inventory of Historic Pub Interiors is a register of public houses in the United Kingdom with interiors which have been noted as being of significant historic interest, having remained largely unchanged for at least 30 years, but usually since at least World War II.

The National Inventory was begun by (and is maintained by) the Campaign for Real Ale as part of that organisation's mission to protect Britain's pub heritage as well as good beer. CAMRA is an independent, voluntary, consumer organisation based in St Albans, England, whose main aims are promoting real ale and the traditional British pub. It is now the largest single-issue consumer group in the UK. Within CAMRA, the "Pub Heritage Group" is established to identify, record and help protect public house interiors of historic and/or architectural importance, and seeks to get them listed, if they are not already. The group maintains two inventories of "Heritage pubs", the National Inventory (NI) and the Regional Inventory (RI), which is broken down by county and contains both those pubs listed in the NI and other pubs that are not eligible for the NI, due to reasons such as having been overly modified, but are still considered historically important, or have particular architectural value.

The NI contains 289 pubs .

CAMRA has established influence at national government level, including English Heritage, and has been designated by the Secretary of State for Trade and Industry as a "super-complainant" to the Office of Fair Trading. CAMRA presents the Pub Design Awards, which are held in association with English Heritage and The Victorian Society.  These comprise several categories, including new build, refurbished, and converted pubs.

References

External links

Heritage registers in the United Kingdom
Pubs in the United Kingdom
 *